Choristoneura albaniana is a moth of the family Tortricidae. It was described by Francis Walker in 1863. In North America it is found from Alaska to Newfoundland, south through the mountains to California, Maine and New Hampshire. It is also found in the northern parts of the Palaearctic region, where it has been recorded from Sweden, Finland, Russia (from the Ural to Trans-Baikal and Amur and along the taiga zone in the Siberian region). The habitat consists of forests in boreal and mountainous regions.

The forewings are beige to brownish yellow with darker, reddish-brown to dark brick-brown markings. The hindwings are usually white with faint strigulations at the apex. Adults are on wing from March to August.

The larvae feed on Prunus pennsylvanica and Larix species.

References

 Choristoneura albaniana in Moth Photographers Group. Mississippi State University.

Moths described in 1863
Choristoneura
Moths of Europe